Tragic Black is an American deathrock band formed in Salt Lake City, Utah, in 2000 by musicians known as Vision and Vyle. It has incorporated elements of darkwave music into each of its albums. Lyrically, Tragic Black's themes for the songs deal with religion, political issues and spirituality.

History 
Tragic Black most recently released video for "Play For Today", a cover by The Cure.  In April 2016, Tragic Black released their latest album "NOSTALGIA" on Danse Macabre Records in Germany.  NOSTALGIA was recorded at BASSLAB studio by Steven Comeau (of STARBASS) who recorded/mixed/mastered and did additional programming.  On NOSTALGIA, the line up returns to a three piece that the band had in their earlier years (featuring; Stich (singer of All Gone Dead) on Guitar, Vyle on Bass/Programming and vISION on vocals/programming).  The sound of Nostalgia is reminiscent of the bands roots in the Goth/Deathrock scene, as well as Industrial.  Nostalgia also featured the majority of the programming/songwriting by vISION.  NOSTALGIA also features remixes by; LARVA (Spanish industrial), Seputus Black (former TB drummer) and vISION.  In 2013, Tragic Black released an album titled "The Eternal Now", which featured a heavier sound compared to their previous works, although remaining a mixture of rock and electronic music the band had been known for.

Influences 
The band cites Rozz Williams as one of the influences, having recorded cover versions of his songs and played at concerts dedicated to his memory. The other inspirations include David Bowie, Mötley Crüe, Bauhaus, Specimen and Skinny Puppy.

Band members 
Current members
vISION – vocals, programming (2000–present)
Vyle –  bass guitar, keys, backing vocals (2000–present)
Ben 'Stich' – guitar, backing vocals (2004, 2010, 2014–present)

Former members

Shadow Windhawk - guitar, bass guitar, backing vocals (2015-2016)
Johno Varoz — lead and rhythm guitar, backing vocals (2013-2014)
Kyle Leary — rhythm and lead guitar, backing vocals (2013-2014)
Seputus — drums, programming, backing vocals (2005-2014)
Toni — guitar, bass, programming (2002)

Ashe — guitar (2005-2006)
Hex — guitar, bass (2005-2007)
Jesse James — guitar, backing vocals (2007-2010)
Filthy McWhiskey — guitar (live)

Discography

Studio albums
Articulate Lacerations (2002)
The Decadent Requiem (2006)
The Cold Caress  (2007)
The Eternal Now  (2013)
Nostalgia  (2016)

Live album
Burnt Black (2005)

Vinyl
The Dead Fall (2010)

EPs
Vatican Demonica (2002)
The Sixx Premonitions (2004)

Compilation appearances
13th Street: The Sound of Mystery 4
Gospels From Your Stereo
New Dark Age Vol.4
Gothic Magazine Compilation Part XXXII
Gothic Magazine Compilation Part XXIV
Gothic Magazine Compilation Part XXXVIII
New Dark Age Vol.3, Strobelight Records
Release The Bats 5 Year Commemortive Tape
New Dark Age vol. 1, Strobelight Records
Dark Arts Festival 2002

References

External links
Official website
Tragic Black on ReverbNation
Tragic Black on MySpace
Tragic Black on Facebook

American death rock groups
American dark wave musical groups
2000 establishments in Utah
Musical groups established in 2000
Musical groups from Salt Lake City